Ora Smith (December 3, 1884 – July 31, 1965) was an American politician and farmer.

Grain farmer and cattle raiser by trade Ora Smith was born December 3, 1884, in New Market, Iowa. He grew up in Alexis and Kirkwood, Illinois and lived in Biggsville, Illinois most of his adult life. Smith went on to serve six terms in the Illinois State House from 1937 to 1949, one term as Illinois State Treasurer from 1949 to 1951 under Adlai Stevenson II and unexpectedly one term as State Senator from 1959 to 1963 as he beat the incumbent Morris E. Muhleman in the closet election in the 53rd's districts history. He made an unsuccessful bid for Clerk of the Illinois Supreme Court in 1950.

November 1958 election - State Senate 53rd seat

D. Ora Smith- 23,174 50%
R. Morris E. Muhleman- 22,736 50%

Smith died on July 31, 1965, at Monmouth Hospital in Monmouth, Illinois. He was buried in Biggsville.

References

1884 births
1965 deaths
People from Henderson County, Illinois
People from Taylor County, Iowa
Farmers from Illinois
Businesspeople from Illinois
Democratic Party members of the Illinois House of Representatives
Democratic Party Illinois state senators
State treasurers of Illinois
20th-century American politicians
20th-century American businesspeople